Andreas Däscher (born 9 June 1927) is a Swiss former ski jumper who is best known for developing the parallel style, or Däscher technique, in the 1950s. This technique became widely used throughout ski jumping until the early 1990s.

This technique was the standard technique until the V-style was developed by Jan Boklöv in 1985. The Daescher technique superseded the Kongsberger technique developed by Jacob Tullin Thams and Sigmund Ruud (both from Norway) after World War I in Kongsberg. Erich Windisch, a German Olympic ski jumper, who developed in 1949 a jumping technique in which the jumper's arms are slightly arched and pointing downward, is also credited along with Däscher of developing the revamped aerodynamic jumping style that was used in elite competition for over 30 years.

His brother, Hans Däscher, was also a ski jumper.

Career
On 3 March 1950, he set the ski jumping world record distance for a very short period of time at 130 metres (426.5 ft) on Heini-Klopfer-Skiflugschanze in Oberstdorf, West Germany. Däscher's best Olympic finish was 6th in the large Hill at the 1956 Winter Olympics in Cortina d'Ampezzo. He was born in Davos.

Four Hills Tournament

Overall standings

Ski jumping world record

Notes

References

External links
 
 
 Olympic Ski Jumping History - ski jumping history
 Wallechinsky, David (1984). Ski Jump, 90-Meter Hill. The Complete Book of the Olympics. p. 621.
 

1927 births
Living people
Swiss male ski jumpers
Ski jumpers at the 1948 Winter Olympics
Ski jumpers at the 1952 Winter Olympics
Ski jumpers at the 1956 Winter Olympics
Ski jumpers at the 1960 Winter Olympics
Olympic ski jumpers of Switzerland
People from Davos
Sportspeople from Graubünden